Kgatleng is one of the districts of Botswana, coterminous with the homeland of the Bakgatla people.  Its capital is Mochudi, the hometown of protagonist Precious Ramotswe in Alexander McCall Smith's popular The No. 1 Ladies' Detective Agency series.  According to the 2001 Census, Kgatleng had a population of 73,507 people.

Kgatleng borders the North West Province of South Africa in the south, and to the east it borders South Africa's Limpopo Province. Domestically, it borders South-East District in southwest, Kweneng District in the west, Central District in the north. The tourist and game reserves in the region are Oodi Weavers and Matsieng footprints.

As of 2011, the total population of the district was 91,660 compared to 73,507 in 2001. The growth rate of population during the decade was 2.23. The total number of workers constituted 25,130 with 13,278 males and 11,853 females, with a majority involved in agriculture. The district is administered by a district administration and district council which are responsible for local administration.

Geography

Kgatleng borders the North West Province of South Africa in the south, and to the east it borders South Africa's Limpopo Province. Domestically, it borders South-East District in southwest, Kweneng District in the west, Central District in north. Most part of Botswana has tableland slopes sliding from east to west. The vegetation type is Savannah, with tall grasses, bushes and trees. Most of the rivers in the region are seasonal which are prone to flash floods, being the most prominent. The tourist and game reserves in the region are Oodi Weavers and Matsieng footprints.

Demographics

As of 2011, the total population of the district was 91,660 compared to 73,507 in 2001. The growth rate of population during the decade was 2.23. The population in the district was 4.53 per cent of the total population in the country. The sex ratio stood at 94.63 for every 100 males, compared to 94.60 in 2001. The average house hold size was 2.96 in 2011 compared to 4.29 in 2001. There were 3,690 craft and related workers, 1,708 clerks, 6,031 people working in elementary occupation 457 Legislators, Administrators & managers 1,477 Plant & machine operators and assemblers, 741 professionals, 2,171 service workers, shop & market sales workers, 1,237 skilled agricultural & related workers 1,482 technicians and associated professionals, making the total work force to 19,167.

Education and economy
As of 2011, there were a total of 038 schools in the district, with 1.70 per cent private schools. The total number of  students in the Council schools was 13,882 while it was 562 in private schools. The total number os students enrolled in the district was 14,444 constituting 6,963 girls and 7,481 boys. The total number of qualified teachers was 621 with 486 females and 135 males. There were around 034 temporary teachers, 15 male and 49 female. There were a total of 0 untrained teachers in the district.

As of 2006, 7,216 were involved in  Agriculture, 1,264 in  Construction, 3,362 in  Education, 177 in  Electricity & Water, 410 in  Finance, 709 in  Health, 658 in  Hotels & Restaurants, 1,397 in  Manufacturing, 057 in  Mining and Quarrying, 554 in  Other Community Services, 1,059 in  Private Households, 2,598 in  Public Administration, 1,014 in  Real Estate, 952 in  Transport & Communications and 3,703 in  Wholesale & Retail Trade. The total number of workers constituted 25,130 with 13,278 males and 11,853 females.

Administration
Botswana gained independence from the British in 1966 and adapted the colonial administration framework to form its district administration. The policies were modified during 1970-74 to address some of the basic issues. The district is administered by a district administration and district council which are responsible for local administration. The policies for the administration are framed by the Ministry of Local Government. The major activities of the council are Tribal Administration, Remote Area Development and Local Governance. The executive powers of the council are vested on a commissioner appointed by the central government. Technical services wing of the Department of Local Government is responsible for developing roads, infrastructure in villages like water supply, schools and recreational facilities. All the staff of the local administration expect District Administration are selected via Unified Local Government Services (ULGS) and the Ministry of Local Government is responsible for their training, deployment and career development. The district has no sub-districts.

See also
Sub-districts of Botswana

References

External links

 
Districts of Botswana